Cinemeducation is the use of film in medical education. It was originally coined by Matthew Alexander, Hall, and Pettice in the journal Family Medicine in 1994 and later used by Matthew Alexander, Anna Pavlov, and Patricia Lenahan in their text of the same title. Cinemeducation emphasises the psychosocial aspects of medicine. It has been used in teaching family systems theory, end-of-life care, medical professionalism and medical ethics, and in psychiatry and mental health services.

See also 
 Film studies, an academic discipline dealing with theoretical, historical, and critical approaches to films
 Medical humanities, an interdisciplinary field of medicine which includes the humanities, social sciences and arts

References 

Medical education